Tell Hadar ('splendid hill') is an archaeological site on the eastern coast of the Sea of Galilee. It contains a settlement and a port. In the 9th century BC the wall was discarded. An excavation revealed two buildings sharing one wall

References

External links

Tel Hadar in biblewalks.com
Tell Hadar Bibliography

Archaeological sites on the Golan Heights